Saucebox was an Asian fusion restaurant and bar in Portland, Oregon. Restaurateur Bruce Carey and chef Chris Israel opened Saucebox in 1995. The restaurant closed permanently in 2020, during the COVID-19 pandemic.

See also
 Impact of the COVID-19 pandemic on the restaurant industry in the United States
 List of defunct restaurants of the United States

References

External links

 

1995 establishments in Oregon
2020 disestablishments in Oregon
Defunct Asian restaurants in Portland, Oregon
Restaurants disestablished during the COVID-19 pandemic
Restaurants disestablished in 2020
Restaurants established in 1995
Southwest Portland, Oregon